The Blind (Otūwhero) River is a small river in the Marlborough district of New Zealand.
A small settlement named Blind River is located on its south bank.

See also
List of rivers of New Zealand

References
Land Information New Zealand - Search for Place Names

Rivers of the Marlborough Region
Rivers of New Zealand